The orangeside triggerfish (Sufflamen verres) is a species of triggerfish found along the Pacific coast of Central and South America from Mexico to Ecuador.  It is also found around the Galapagos Islands.

References

External links
 

Balistidae
Taxa named by Charles Henry Gilbert
Taxa named by Edwin Chapin Starks
Fish described in 1904